The Prix Jacques Prévert du Scénario is a French film award created in 2007 by the French Screenwriters Guild (La Guilde Française des Scénaristes), a trade association which represents more than 350 screenwriters working in the film, television and animation sectors in France.

The award is named in honour of the French poet and screenwriter Jacques Prévert (1900 – 1977). It recognises outstanding screenplays of films released in the previous year, in which winners are decided by a jury. The awards ceremony is usually held on 4 February every year to coincide with the birth anniversary of the late writer.

The awards are given in two categories: "Best Original Screenplay" for a screenplay written directly for the screen, and "Best Adaptation" for a screenplay based on a previously released or published work.

Winners and nominees

Best Original Screenplay

Best Adaptation

Special Prize

Jury 
The jury chooses the winners from among the films selected by the Guild.
 2007: Vincent Perez (President), Éric Assous, Gérard Bitton, Louis Gardel, Randa Haines, Guillaume Laurant, Michel Munz, Jean-Pierre Ronssin and Jérôme Soubeyrand
 2008: Danièle Thompson (President), Pascal Kané, Olivier Lorelle, Lorraine Lévy, Juliette Sales, Jérôme Soubeyrand, Gilles Taurand, Anne-Louise Trividic, Pierre Uytterhoeven and Philippe Vuaillat
 2009: Tonie Marshall (President), Gilles Adrien, Santiago Amigorena, Olivier Dague, Jean-François Goyet, Bernard Jeanjean, Olivier Lorelle, Gladys Marciano, Emmanuelle Sardou and Florence Vignon.
 2010: Jean Cosmos (President), Natalie Carter, Laurent Chouchan, Benoit Delépine, Laurence Ferreira Barbosa, Olivier Gorce, Marion Laine, Benoît Graffin, Jérôme Soubeyrand and Marjane Satrapi
 2012: Pascal Bonitzer (President), Agnès de Sacy, Claire Lemaréchal, Jean-Marie Duprez, Lise Macheboeuf and Juliette Sales
 2014: Laurent Tirard (President), Grégoire Vigneron (President), Nelly Allard, Emmanuel Courcol, Guillaume Lemans, Raphaële Moussafir and Fabien Suarez
 2015: Guillaume Laurant (President), Jacques Akchoti, Jamal Belmahi, Romain Compingt, Manon Dillys, Nadia Lakhdar and Gladys Marciano
 2016: Éric Toledano (President), Olivier Nakache (President), Agnès de Sacy, Nadine Lamari, Hélène Le Gal, Claude Le Pape and Jimmy Laporal Trésor

References

External links
 Official website of La Guilde Française des Scénaristes 
 Prix Jacques Prévert du Scénario at AlloCiné

French film awards
Awards established in 2007
Screenwriting awards for film